The 1989 Deutsche Tourenwagen Meisterschaft was the sixth season of premier German touring car championship and also fourth season under the moniker of Deutsche Tourenwagen Meisterschaft.

The championship was the last to run under heavily modified Group A regulations, including the use of air restrictors. The champion was Roberto Ravaglia with 3 victories driving a BMW M3 Evo.

1989 was the final season of DTM that featured turbocharged engines until 2019, as in 1990 the DTM would move to a more unique ruleset varying greatly from the traditional Group A regulations.

Teams and drivers

References 

Deutsche Tourenwagen Masters seasons
1989 in German motorsport
1989 in West German motorsport